Strzaliny  (formerly ) is a village in the administrative district of Gmina Tuczno, within Wałcz County, West Pomeranian Voivodeship, in north-western Poland.

The village has a population of 190.

In the village there is a historic wooden church of the Visitation, dating back to the 17th century.

Before 1772 the area was part of Kingdom of Poland, 1772–1945 Prussia and Germany. For more on its history, see Wałcz County.

References

Strzaliny